École secondaire Joseph-François-Perrault is a francophone public mixed secondary school in Montreal, Quebec, located in the heart of the Saint-Michel district in Villeray-Saint-Michel-Parc-Extension borough and operated by the Centre de services scolaire de Montréal (CSSDM).

The school was established in 1966. Its music program began in 1978, and it began offering the International Baccalaureate program in 1999. In 2020, it had 1,504 students and 101 teachers. It is the only school in Quebec to offer a parallel curriculum in Arts Studies-Classical Music with International Education Program.

Prior to 1998, it was operated by the Montreal Catholic School Commission  (CECM).

History
Established in 1966, the school was based on the concept of a school-park. The school was divided in three blocks with separated boys and girls aisle around a common space with services. The CECM considered at that time that it was the most modern school in Montreal.

School and facilities
The school has 3 stories, is divided in 3 interrelated blocks and is located in the François-Perreault octagonal Park. The building is in multicolor brown bricks with prefabricated concrete insertions especially for openings like windows and doors. Other than classrooms, it contains an auditorium (200 seats), a cafeteria, computer labs, science labs, a gymnasium and soundproof cubicles for practicing music. Outdoor facilities, included in the school-park, are an exterior swimming pool, a soccer field, 4 tennis courts, 2 basketball courts and a hockey field.

Student life

Events
Apple-pick trip
Environment (Bruntland Green Establishment);
Noon Cinema;
French Week;
Gala Meritas;
Graduation Ball;
Music Month;
Noon activities;
Opti-math Concourse;
Physical activities Month;
Shows and concerts;
Ski trips;
Sugar schack trip;
Thematic Week and Day;
Young Democrats Tournament.

Sports
Badminton;
Basketball;
Flag football;
Cosom hockey;
Ski trips
Soccer;
Volleyball.

Culture
Génies en herbe
Guitar course
Harmony Band
Improvisational Theatre
Student Radio
Theatre

Notable students
Marco Calliari, singer, song-writer and musician;
Sylvie Fréchette, synchronized swimmer and Olympic medalist
Josée Legault, author, journalist and political commentator

References

External links
 École secondaire Joseph-François-Perrault 
 École secondaire Joseph-François-Perrault  (Archive)

High schools in Montreal
1966 establishments in Quebec
Educational institutions established in 1966